Alfreda "Freda" Simmonds (1912–1983) was a painter from New Zealand.

Career 
Simmonds studied at the University of Auckland. At the end of World War II, Simmonds moved to Kaitaia, in the north of New Zealand, and developed an interest in painting. Over several years she developed her artistic techniques at Adult Education Summer Schools in Auckland, New Zealand.

Many of Simmonds's works are landscapes and her painting style is abstract, often using "curvi-linear forms" and gradations of colour. Notable works include Rimu (1958), Northern Landscape, Northland Harbour: Houhora Black Swan, and Torea – Pied Oyster Catcher sold at International Art Centre, 'The John Leech Collection'. 

Her work is included in several art collections including the Victoria University of Wellington Art Collection.

Exhibitions 

She was active in The Group, an informal art association from Christchurch, New Zealand, formed to provide a freer alternative to the Canterbury Society of Arts. She contributed works to multiple exhibitions by The Group including in: 1957; 1963; 1964; 1965; 1966 (as Alfreda Simmonds); 1967; 1968; 1969; 1970; 1971; 1973; 1974; and 1977.

References

Further reading 
Artist files for Simmonds are held at:
 Angela Morton Collection, Takapuna Library
 E. H. McCormick Research Library, Auckland Art Gallery Toi o Tāmaki
 Fine Arts Library, University of Auckland
 Hocken Collections Uare Taoka o Hākena
 Te Aka Matua Research Library, Museum of New Zealand Te Papa Tongarewa
Also see:
 Concise Dictionary of New Zealand Artists McGahey, Kate (2000) Gilt Edge

1912 births
1983 deaths
New Zealand women painters
People from Auckland
University of Auckland alumni
People associated with the Museum of New Zealand Te Papa Tongarewa
People associated with the Auckland Society of Arts
People associated with The Group (New Zealand art)